Darwin McCutcheon (born April 19, 1962) is a Canadian retired professional ice hockey defenceman. He played one game in the National Hockey League with the Toronto Maple Leafs during the 1981–82 season, on December 31, 1981 against the Detroit Red Wings. McCutcheon was born in Listowel, Ontario, but grew up in Brussels, Ontario.

Playing career
McCutcheon signed with the Kitchener Rangers as a walk-on and played 3 years in the Ontario Hockey League with the Rangers, Toronto Marlboros and was the captain of the Windsor Spitfires in his last year of junior. He was called up to the Toronto Maple Leafs in his last year. He then played hockey for the University of Prince Edward Island for 4 years and was named All Star 3 years and also All Canadian 1984–85.

Career statistics

Regular season and playoffs

References

External links
 

1962 births
Living people
Canadian expatriate ice hockey players in the United States
Canadian ice hockey defencemen
Flint Spirits players
Ice hockey people from Ontario
Indianapolis Ice players
Kitchener Rangers players
Moncton Golden Flames players
People from Huron County, Ontario
People from Perth County, Ontario
Salt Lake Golden Eagles (IHL) players
Toronto Maple Leafs draft picks
Toronto Maple Leafs players
Toronto Marlboros players
UPEI Panthers ice hockey players
Windsor Spitfires players